Angélique-Louise Verrier (1762–1805) was a French painter.

Born in the Parisian parish of Saint-Eustache, Verrier was a pupil of Adélaïde Labille-Guiard; in 1785 she exhibited work in the salon de la Jeunesse, and in 1802 paintings by her hand appeared in the Paris Salon. She is recorded as a pastellist in a 1786 letter published in the Mercure de France. By 1799 she was married to a Louis Maillard, as in that year their son Louis-Auguste-Jean-Baptiste was baptized at Saint-Germain l'Auxerrois. Maillard was dead by October 1801, when a posthumous inventory of his possessions was taken. Verrier remains an obscure figure; long conflated with her contemporary Marie-Nicole Vestier, it was only in 2016 that information about her career was first published.

References

1762 births
1805 deaths
French women painters
18th-century French painters
18th-century French women artists
19th-century French painters
19th-century French women artists
Painters from Paris
Pastel artists
Pupils of Adélaïde Labille-Guiard